Huang Chao (born 30 June 1992) is a Chinese-born Singaporean former badminton player. He is a one-time national champion.

Early life
Huang was born in Jingzhou, Hubei, China, and joined the Singapore Badminton Association (SBA) on the Foreign Sports Talent Scheme in 2004 when he was 12 years old. The three-time provincial junior champion, whose father Huang Kai was a national player for China in the 1980s.

Career
In 2010, he was Singapore's lone badminton representative at the inaugural Youth Olympic Games. He made it to the quarter-finals, upsetting India's second seed B. Sai Praneeth along the way.

Huang was part of the squad who won men's team bronzes at the 2009 and 2011 Southeast Asian Games. He is a former national champion, having won the men's singles title at the 2013 edition. He also played a part in the mixed team bronze at 2014's Glasgow Commonwealth Games.

Huang retired from the Singapore national badminton team on 1 September 2015 due to shoulder injury. He is expected to remain in Singapore and has not ruled out the possibility of working with the Singapore Badminton Association in the future.

Personal life
Huang became a Singapore citizen in 2010.

Achievements
2014
Glasgow Commonwealth Games Mixed team - 3rd
2011
Indonesia SEA Games Men's team - 3rd
2009
Laos SEA Games Men's team - 3rd

References

Singaporean male badminton players
1992 births
Living people
People from Jingzhou
Badminton players from Hubei
Chinese emigrants to Singapore
Badminton players at the 2010 Summer Youth Olympics
Badminton players at the 2014 Commonwealth Games
Commonwealth Games bronze medallists for Singapore
Commonwealth Games medallists in badminton
Competitors at the 2009 Southeast Asian Games
Competitors at the 2011 Southeast Asian Games
Southeast Asian Games bronze medalists for Singapore
Southeast Asian Games medalists in badminton
Medallists at the 2014 Commonwealth Games